Brian Gibbons  (born 25 August 1950) is a medical doctor who was the Labour Party Assembly Member for Aberavon from May 1999 to May 2011. He served in the Welsh Government as Minister for Health and Social Services from 2005 to 2007, Minister for the Economy and Transport in 2007, and Minister for Social Justice and Local Government from 2007 to 2009.

Born in Dublin, a son of the former Irish Fianna Fáil politician, Hugh Gibbons, he was raised in County Roscommon Ireland, and moved to Yorkshire in 1976 to train as a general medical practitioner in Calderdale. He subsequently became a GP in Blaengwynfi and also worked as a GP in partnership with Julian Tudor Hart at Glyncorrwg in the Afan Valley near Port Talbot.

A member of the British Medical Association (BMA), the Socialist Health Association, and the Medical Practitioners Union (UNITE), he is a fellow of the Royal College of General Practitioners, and a former Secretary to the Morgannwg Local Medical Committee.

Political background
He was Assembly Member for Aberavon from May 1999 (First Assembly) to May 2011. Gibbons was appointed a Deputy Minister for Health (coalition government) in October 2000. He was appointed a Deputy Minister for Economic Development and Transport in May 2003 (Second Assembly) and was promoted to the post of Welsh Assembly Government Minister for Health and Social Services in January 2005. In the first Cabinet of the Third Assembly he was appointed Minister for the Economy and Transport in May 2007, and Minister for Social Justice and Local Government in the coalition government in July 2007. He then took the decision to stand down at the 2011 Welsh Assembly election and was succeeded by David Rees of the Labour Party.

External links
Brian Gibbons AM Website
Welsh Labour Party Website
Website of the Welsh Assembly Government

Offices held

1950 births
Living people
Welsh Labour members of the Senedd
Wales AMs 1999–2003
Wales AMs 2003–2007
Wales AMs 2007–2011
Members of the Welsh Assembly Government
British people of Irish descent
National Health Service people
20th-century Welsh medical doctors
British general practitioners
Fellows of the Royal College of General Practitioners